The Rebirth of Agony is the 7th album by Leæther Strip.

Track listing
 You Know Where To Put It
 Life is Painful (Bastard)
 Switch On - Switch Off
 Lies to Tell
 My Mind is My Master
 How Do I Know?
 The Edge of Anger
 I Want You Hard
 Take Care of Me
 Anger is a Part of Me
 Make My Blood Boil
 Fool!

Leæther Strip albums